The following is a list of Miami RedHawks men's basketball head coaches. There have been 28 head coaches of the RedHawks in their 118-season history.

Miami's current head coach is Travis Steele. He was hired as the RedHawks' head coach in March 2022, replacing Jack Owens, who was fired after the 2021–22 season.

References

Miami Ohio

Miami RedHawks basketball, men's, coaches